Keyworth Stadium is a 7,933 seat multi-purpose stadium located in Hamtramck, Michigan, an enclave of Detroit. It was opened by former president Franklin Delano Roosevelt on October 15, 1936, during his second campaign for president. Keyworth was the first Works Progress Administration project in the state of Michigan.

Democratic Senator John F. Kennedy spoke at Keyworth Stadium during his successful 1960 presidential campaign.

The stadium is owned by Hamtramck Public Schools and it is currently used mostly for soccer and American football matches.

The professional soccer club Detroit City FC initiated a crowd-based investment program to renovate and rehabilitate the stadium, intending to move their home games to the stadium in 2016. On February 5, 2016, Detroit City owners announced that they had successfully raised the minimum $400,000 to begin renovations, with the investment drive topping off at $741,250 by the midnight deadline on February 15, 2016.

The club played their first game at their new home on May 20, 2016.

DCFC set a new club attendance record of 7,887 in a 0–10 loss to Serie A side Frosinone Calcio on July 31, 2018.

On September 11, 2020, the National Independent Soccer Association announced that Keyworth Stadium would host the 2020 NISA Fall Playoffs. The tournament took place behind closed doors owing to the then on-going COVID-19 pandemic.

References

External links
 Detroit City FC Stadium Guide

Sports venues in Wayne County, Michigan
Hamtramck, Michigan
Soccer venues in Michigan
National Premier Soccer League stadiums
Sports venues in Michigan
Works Progress Administration in Michigan
Former National Independent Soccer Association stadiums